Bert Wright may refer to:

Bert Wright (cricketer) (1926-1994), Australian cricketer
Bert Wright (figure skater), American ice dancer
Bert Wright (footballer) (born 1920), English footballer

See also
 Bertie Wright (1871–1960), actor
 Bertie Wright (cricketer) (1897–1955), English cricketer
 Albert Wright (disambiguation)
 Herbert Wright (disambiguation)
 Robert Wright (disambiguation)